Statistics of American Soccer League II in season 1963–64.

League standings

References

 American Soccer League II (RSSSF)

American Soccer League (1933–1983) seasons
American Soccer League, 1963-64